This is a list of cricket grounds in Nepal. International matches are currently played only at the Tribhuvan University International Cricket Ground in Kirtipur on the outskirts of Kathmandu. Women's international matches have been played at the Pokhara Rangashala in Pokhara. New grounds capable of hosting international matches are under construction in Mulpani, Kathmandu and Bharatpur, Chitwan.

International cricket grounds

Women's international cricket grounds

Under construction

Domestic cricket grounds

Province No. 1

Province No. 2

Bagmati

Gandaki

Lumbini

Karnali

Sudurpashchim

Proposed

See also
 Cricket in Nepal
 Cricket Association of Nepal
Nepal national cricket team

References

External links
Grounds in Nepal at CricketArchive.
 Grounds, Nepal at ESPNcricinfo

 
Cricket grounds
Nepal